Ruth Watkins DeMond Brooks (January 29, 1902 – May 15, 1987) was an American educator. She taught history at Cardozo High School in Washington, D.C. for 28 years. Her father and husband were prominent ministers.

Early life 
Ruth Watkins DeMond was born in New Orleans, the eldest of five children born to Abraham Lincoln DeMond and Lula Irene Watkins Patterson DeMond. Her father was an Episcopalian minister, born and educated in New York, and at Howard University. Her mother, from Alabama, studied music in Boston and taught at several black colleges; she was also active in temperance work.

Ruth DeMond earned a bachelor's degree from Syracuse University in 1924, and earned a master's degree in history at the University of Chicago.

Career 
Brooks taught at Douglass High School in Baltimore for five years as a young woman, and taught history at Cardozo High School in Washington, D.C. for 28 years, with a permanent appointment granted in 1932. She was teaching at the school when it integrated in 1954. She retired from teaching in 1957.

Personal life 
In 1928, Ruth DeMond was a bridesmaid at the wedding of her friend and school colleague Yolande Du Bois (daughter of W. E. B. Du Bois) to poet Countee Cullen, in New York. In December 1931, at her father's church in Nashville, she married Robert William Brooks, pastor of Lincoln Temple Congregational Church in Washington, D.C. She was widowed when Rev. Brooks died in 1952, and she died in 1987, aged 85, at a nursing home in Wheaton, Maryland. 

Brooks' sister Marguerite DeMond married Harlem Renaissance journalist John P. Davis. In 1989, a library book borrowed by Ruth DeMond in 1926 was returned to the Nashville Public Library system by Brooks' nephew, journalist Michael DeMond Davis.

References 

1902 births
1987 deaths
People from New Orleans
American educators
Syracuse University alumni
University of Chicago alumni
20th-century African-American women
20th-century African-American people